is a stable of sumo wrestlers, part of the Dewanoumi ichimon or group of stables. It was established in its current form in December 2003 by former maegashira and Nihon University amateur champion Higonoumi, who branched off from Mihogaseki stable. The stable's first top division wrestler was Kiyoseumi in January 2008. Its foreign recruit, Georgian Gagamaru, in May 2010 earned promotion to the top division. It is a popular destination for wrestlers with collegiate sumo experience like its stablemaster, and the retirement of Gagamaru in November 2020 opened up another spot for a foreigner.

Following the demotion of Kise-oyakata (or stablemaster) in May 2010 after a scandal involving the selling of tournament tickets to members of the yakuza, Kise stable was dissolved with all 27 of its wrestlers moving to the affiliated Kitanoumi stable. Kise was allowed to reestablish the stable in April 2012. All former members, as well as newcomers Jōkōryu and Sasanoyama (now Daiseiryū), joined the reconstituted stable. Jōkōryu reached the rank of  komusubi in 2014, but has since fallen greatly down the ranks due to injury, and Daiseidō in September 2017 became the eleventh wrestler from Kise to reach jūryō since its founding in 2003.  As of January 2023 has 22 wrestlers, five of them are sekitori (salaried ranks).

Kise stable's first makuuchi championship was delivered by Tokushōryū in the January 2020 tournament. The 33-year-old won from the bottom-most makuuchi rank of maegashira 17, after spending all but one of the previous 12 tournaments in the jūryō division.

In May 2022 the stable recruited the first ever student of the University of Tokyo, an elite academic institution, to join professional sumo.

Ring name conventions
Some wrestlers at this stable take ring names or shikona that begin with the characters 肥後 (read: higo), in honor of their coach and the stable's owner, the former Higonoumi. The best known is former jūryō wrestler Higonojō. Some other low-ranking members are Higoarashi, Higonoryū, and Higohikari.

Owner
2003-2010, 2012–present: 11th Kimura Sehei - abbreviated Kise (shunin, former maegashira Higonoumi)

Notable active wrestlers

Tokushōryū (best rank maegashira 2)
Ura (best rank maegashira 1)
Hidenoumi (best rank maegashira 6)
Shimanoumi (best rank maegashira 3)
Akiseyama (best rank maegashira 12)
Kinbōzan (best rank maegashira 14)
 (best rank jūryō)
 (best rank jūryō)
 (best rank jūryō)

Notable former members
Gagamaru (former komusubi)
Jōkōryū (former komusubi)
Kiyoseumi (former maegashira)
Tokushinhō (former jūryō)
 (former jūryō)
 (former jūryō )
 (former jūryō)

Coach
Inagawa Yūki (iin, former komusubi Futen'ō)
Wakafuji Nobuhide (iin, former maegashira Ōtsukasa) (from February 1, 2023)

Referee
Kimura Shōichi (sandanme gyōji, real name Daisuke Takano)

Usher
Naoki  (sandanme yobidashi, real name Naoki Kitajima)

Hairdresser
Tokokuma (Third class tokoyama)

Location and access
Tokyo, Sumida Ward, Tachikawa 1-16-8
5 minute walk from Morishita Station on the Toei Shinjuku Line

See also
List of sumo stables
List of active sumo wrestlers
List of past sumo wrestlers
Glossary of sumo terms

References

External links
Japan Sumo Association profile

Active sumo stables